John Blockey (born 2 April 1932) is a British bobsledder. He competed in the two-man and the four-man events at the 1968 Winter Olympics.

References

1937 births
Living people
British male bobsledders
Olympic bobsledders of Great Britain
Bobsledders at the 1968 Winter Olympics
People from Hindhead